The 1950 New York Yanks season was their first as the Yanks (previously being the New York Bulldogs, Boston Yanks, Brooklyn Dodgers and  original founding APFA member and Ohio League franchise Dayton Triangles). 

The team improved on their previous season's output of 1–10–1, winning seven games. Their games were particularly high scoring; in seven of their twelve games, forty or more points were scored by a single team.

Offseason

Draft

Schedule

Standings

References

1950
New York Yanks
New York Yanks